Heuer is a surname that comes from the German word "Heu" meaning "hay." The name is occupational in origin, especially so, when it serves as an element in a compound. Heumaier would refer to the officer who oversaw the delivery of the hay harvest. Heuwemenger is the equivalent of "Heuhändler" meaning hay merchant.

The surname Heuer was first found in what are now Germany and Switzerland, where the earliest mentions of the name include Cunrat der Hewer in Württemberg in 1329, Heu in Konstanz, Hauwemenger in Frankfurt in 1387, and Heurechen in Zürich in 1400. The name could also be found in Bohemia and Moravia in the 14th century, especially within compound names, such as Heuleiter, Heureufel, Heubüschl, Heuteuer, and Heuradem.

People with the surname
Notable people with the surname include:

Codi Heuer (born 1996), American baseball player
Richards Heuer, former CIA veteran
Johannes Wolfgang Willy Friedlieb Heuer (1910–1993), German immigrant and founder of a family music business
Rolf-Dieter Heuer (born 1948), German particle physicist and the Director General of CERN

Heuer settlers in United States in the 18th century 

 Konrad Heuer, who arrived in Pennsylvania in 1767
 Julius Heuer, who landed in America in 1780
 Peter Heuer, who landed in America in 1780
 August Heuer, who arrived in America in 1783

Heuer settlers in United States in the 19th century 

 Jacob Heuer who landed in Philadelphia in 1817
 Carl Christian Fr. Heuer and his wife and their three daughters settled in St. Louis, Missouri
 Daniel Heuer, aged 34, who arrived in America in 1839
 Michael Heuer, who arrived in America in 1839
 Joachim Heuer, who arrived in America in 1839

Heuer Settlers in United States in the 20th century 

 David Heuer and his wife and two children settled in Philadelphia in 1912

Heuer settlers in Canada in the 18th Century 

 August Heuer, who settled in Canada in 1783 after serving as a mercenary soldier with the British during the American Revolution

Contemporary notables of the name Heuer (post-1700) 

 Robert Heuer (1916–1951), German highly decorated Oberleutnant in the Luftwaffe during World War II
 Rolf-Dieter Heuer (b. 1948), German particle physicist
 Robert M Heuer, American general manager and chief executive officer of the Florida Grand Opera
 Chris Heuer, American Internet entrepreneur from San Francisco
 Richards J Heuer Jr., American veteran of the Central Intelligence Agency for forty-five years
 William C. F. Heuer, American Democratic politician, member of Minnesota State Senate 51st District, 1955–59; Alternate Delegate to Democratic National Convention from Minnesota, 1956
 Melvin E. Heuer, American politician, Republican candidate for U.S. Representative from Michigan 16th District, 1978
 Henry J. Heuer, American politician, candidate for U.S. Representative from New York 5th District, 1908
 Ann F. Heuer, American politician, delegate to Republican National Convention from District of Columbia, 1988
 Albert R. Heuer, American politician, village president of River Rouge, Michigan, 1921–22

Historic Events for the Heuer family

Bismarck 

 Bernhard Heuer (1922–2018), German Matrose who served aboard the German Battleship Bismarck during World War II when it was sunk heading to France; he survived the sinking

See also
 TAG Heuer, a Swiss watchmaker known for its sports watches and chronographs.
W. Heuer Pianos and instruments Stellenbosch https://www.wheuer.co.za/
 Hoya (disambiguation)